Copelatus mimetes is a species of diving beetle. It is part of the genus Copelatus, which is in the subfamily Copelatinae of the family Dytiscidae. It was described by Félix Guignot in 1957.

References

mimetes
Beetles described in 1957